Sir Charles Cavendish Boyle  (29 May 1849 – 17 September 1916) was a British civil servant, magistrate, and colonial administrator who served as Colonial Governor of Newfoundland, Mauritius and British Guiana. He wrote the lyrics for the anthem of the Dominion and later Province of Newfoundland, "Ode to Newfoundland".

Early life and education
Known as Cavendish Boyle, he was born in Barbados into an ancient British family, the son of Capt. Cavendish Spencer Boyle and Rose Susan Alexander, daughter of Lt-Col. C. C. Alexander. He was the grandson of Sir Courtenay Boyle and the great-grandson of the Seventh Earl of Cork and Earl of Orrery. His elder brother, Sir Courtenay Edmund Boyle, was also a civil servant who served as Permanent Secretary to the Board of Trade.

Boyle was educated in London at Charterhouse, and later studied colonial administration and law.

Career

Boyle joined the British Colonial Office and was made magistrate in the Leeward Islands in 1879. He served as Colonial Secretary in Bermuda from 1882 to 1888 and in Gibraltar from 1888 to 1894. He was appointed a Companion of the  Order of Saint Michael and Saint John (CMG) in 1889, and granted a knighthood in the same order in the 1897 Diamond Jubilee Honours.

In 1894 he moved to British Guiana, where he was Government Secretary and acted as Governor several times.

In March 1901, he was appointed Governor of Newfoundland, where he arrived in St. Johns in mid-June. He stayed as such until 1904, and wrote poems to the island's rugged beauty including the Ode to Newfoundland which was adopted as the dominion's national anthem. As governor, Boyle donated a trophy, the Boyle Challenge Cup, to the Newfoundland Hockey League.

He continued his colonial career with a posting as the 19th Governor of Mauritius from 20 August 1904 to 10 April 1911, after which he retired to Brighton, England.

Personal life
In 1914, Boyle married to Louise Judith Sassoon , daughter of Reuben David Sassoon (1835-1905). They had no children. He died in London in 1916 after undergoing an operation. His widow, who was 25 years his junior, lived to be 90, dying in 1964.

References

External links 
Biography at Government House The Governorship of Newfoundland and Labrador
Biography at the Dictionary of Canadian Biography Online

1849 births
1916 deaths
Knights Commander of the Order of St Michael and St George
National anthem writers
Governors of Newfoundland Colony
Governors of British Mauritius
Sassoon family
Colonial Secretaries of Gibraltar
Colonial Secretaries of Bermuda
People from Bridgetown
People educated at Charterhouse School